The 10" Personal Defense Weapon (PDW) is a carbine made by the Government Arsenal of the Philippines, based on the M4 carbine/M16 rifle. It  cycles fully automatic with specially developed 7.62×37mm Musang subsonic and supersonic rounds.

50 prototypes of the weapon underwent field testing and evaluation with Special Operations units of the Armed Forces of the Philippines.

Development
Designed to replace the MP5 submachine gun and 5.56mm carbines used by the Armed Forces of the Philippines (AFP) in close combat use, its design objectives included increased lethality over subsonic 9mm and 5.56mm cartridges, improved controllability, reduction in size and weight, and a maximum effective range of 300 meters.

References

Weapons of the Philippines
ArmaLite AR-10 derivatives
Carbines